Juan Pablo Compagnucci (born 18 November 1986, in Monte Buey) is an Argentine footballer who plays for Sarmiento Leones.

References

External links
Profile at soccerway.com

1986 births
Living people
Argentine people of Italian descent
Argentine footballers
Association football defenders
First Professional Football League (Bulgaria) players
PFC Lokomotiv Plovdiv players
Expatriate footballers in Bulgaria
Sportspeople from Córdoba Province, Argentina